In the Blink of an Eye: A Perspective on Film Editing is a non-fiction filmmaking book on the art and craft of editing authored by Walter Murch.  The book suggests editors prioritize emotion over the pure technicalities of editing.  According to The Film Stage, the book “is often considered the essential literary source on film editing.”

The book is based on a transcription of a lecture Murch gave about editing in 1988. In 2001, it was revised to reflect changes in digital editing.

In particular, Murch uses his experience editing The English Patient to explore the digital side of editing.

Much of the book references experiences Murch had editing The English Patient, Apocalypse Now, and The Godfather.

References

Books about film